Waun Cimla, also known as Bedford Park is a Site of Special Scientific Interest in Glamorgan, south Wales. It contains the Cefn Cribwr Ironworks and some 40 acres of woodlands and meadows.

The SSSI is designated for its marshy grassland habitats, rare plant species and marsh fritillary butterfly.

See also
List of Sites of Special Scientific Interest in Mid & South Glamorgan

References

Sites of Special Scientific Interest in Mid & South Glamorgan